In music, a radio edit or radio mix is a modification, typically truncated or censored, intended to make a song more suitable for airplay, whether it be adjusted for length, profanity, subject matter, instrumentation, or form. Radio edits may also be used for commercial single versions, which may be denoted as the 7" version, as opposed to the 12" version which are extended versions of a song. Not all "radio edit" tracks are played on radio.

Editing for time
Radio edits often shorten a long song in order to make it more commercially viable for radio stations. The normal length for songs played on the radio is between 3 and 5 minutes. The amount of cut content differs however, ranging from a few seconds to effectively half of a song being cut. It is common for radio edits to have shortened intros and/or outros. In the intro, any kind of musical buildup is removed, or, if there is no such build-up, an extensive intro is often halved. In the outro, occasionally, the song will simply fade out earlier, common on tracks with long instrumental endings, or, if it doesn't fade out, a part before the ending will be cut out or in some cases, a fade out was added in the radio edit. It is also frequent that a chorus is repeated less often towards the end. However, if necessary, many radio edits will also edit out verses, choruses, bridges, or interludes in between.

An example is the radio edit of "'Heroes'" (1977) by David Bowie, which fades in shortly before the beginning of the third verse and fades out shortly before the vocal vamping at the end of the song. Another example is B.o.B's song, "Nothin' On You" (2009) featuring Bruno Mars, whose radio edit skips the first five seconds and starts with the sixth second in which Bruno Mars starts singing the first chorus. The second half of the first chorus is sometimes skipped, along with the last 24 seconds which is the normal fadeout part in which B.o.B says, "Yeah, and that's just how we do it/And Ima let this ride/B.o.B and Bruno Mars", and the radio edit ends with the fourth and last chorus with an earlier fade-out. A third example would be the song, "The Man" (2014) by Aloe Blacc, in which the radio edit skips the "I'm the man/Go ahead & tell everybody/What I'm saying ya all" part and the first ten seconds. Also, the third chorus of the song is shortened. 
Another example for this case is Justin Timberlake's "Mirrors" (2013), where the radio edit cuts the entire "You are the love of my life" part.  Another example would be Juvenile's "Back That Thang Up" (1999) where Lil' Wayne's outro is faded out in the "wobble de wop" part. Another example for this case would be Lenny Kravitz's "Fly Away" (1998), whose radio edit has shortened intro, first half of third verse is omitted, and final chorus is shortened. A seventh example would be the song, "I Believe I Can Fly" (1996) by R. Kelly, in which the radio edit cuts the entire intro.

Some songs will be remixed heavily and feature different arrangements than the original longer versions, occasionally even being completely different recordings. A popular example of this is "Revolution" (1968) by the Beatles which is a completely different recording from the version which appears on The White Album. Another example is Miley Cyrus's "Adore You" (2013), whose original album version is a slow, quiet version clocking in at 4 minutes 37 seconds; the radio edit is a completely different version which is a remix done by Cedric Gervais running at 3 minutes, 36 seconds. Likewise, an attempt at a radio edit for Arlo Guthrie's 18-minute epic "Alice's Restaurant" (1967) scrapped the entire monologue that served as the main base of the song's popularity and instead was a 4-minute, three-verse rock and roll song. This also became more prevalent with the rise of the 12" record, as artists like New Order started making songs specifically for the format. Many of the 7" mixes aimed for pop radio airplay of their songs feature very different arrangements, such as "Bizarre Love Triangle" (1986), or even a completely different recording, such as "Temptation" (1982).

Some long songs do not have a radio edit, despite being as long as 5, 6, 7, or 8 minutes in length, presumably due to listener demand from radio stations. Examples of this include the following songs: "Vicarious" (2006) by Tool at 7 minutes and 6 seconds, "Hey Jude" (1968) by the Beatles at 7 minutes and 11 seconds long,  "You're the Voice" (1986) by John Farnham at 5 minutes and 4 seconds long, "Stairway to Heaven" (1971) by Led Zeppelin at 8 minutes and 3 seconds, "Georgia Dome" (2004) by Ying Yang Twins (which actually has a radio edit but only removing profanity and not shortening it) at 6 minutes and 6 seconds, "Like a Rolling Stone" (1965) by Bob Dylan at 6 minutes and 13 seconds, "Someone Saved My Life Tonight" (1975) by Elton John at 6 minutes and 45 seconds, and "Again" (2015) by Fetty Wap at 5 minutes and 13 seconds. The idea of extended songs receiving airplay on commercial radio was extremely rare until the birth of progressive radio in the mid-1960s; most rock music formats descend from progressive radio, and as such, rock songs tend to be played at their original length, longer than songs of other genres.

On rare occasions, a radio edit may even be longer than the original album version. This may occur when the song is edited for form, such as in the cases of "Creep" (1992) by Radiohead, "2 On" (2014) by Tinashe, and "Miserable" (1999) by Lit. "Creep"s radio edit has a four-second drumstick count off before the regular first second, "2 On" repeats part of the chorus one more time than it does on the original album version, and "Miserable"s radio edit adds the chorus between the first and second verses. Some radio edits lengthen some parts of the song while shortening others. For example, the radio edit of "Thinking Out Loud" (2014) by Ed Sheeran has a six-second introduction before the first verse but later in the song cuts from the end of the second verse to the beginning of the last chorus, omitting the second chorus and the guitar solo. Another example is the radio edit of Maroon 5's "Beautiful Mistakes" (2021) in which the second verse is cut while the third verse, performed by Megan Thee Stallion, is split into two verses with the chorus added in between. Different radio stations may edit songs differently for length; an example is "Uptown Funk" (2014) by Mark Ronson and Bruno Mars. Another example is Timbaland's song "The Way I Are" (2007) featuring Keri Hilson, where the radio edit cuts the last two verses and repeats the chorus in the outro.

The syndicated radio format "QuickHitz", notably adopted by the Calgary radio station CKMP-FM in August 2014, utilizes even shorter edits of songs, from 1 minute 30 seconds to 2 minutes in length.

In the song "The Entertainer" (1974) by Billy Joel, he alludes directly to radio edits for time:

"You've heard my latest record, 
It's been on the radio; 
Ah, it took me years to write it, 
They were the best years of my life, 
It was a beautiful song,
But it ran too long,
If you're gonna have a hit,
You gotta make it fit,
So they cut it down to 3:05."

Editing for content

Radio edits often come with any necessary censorship done to conform to decency standards imposed by government agencies, such as the Federal Communications Commission in the United States, the Canadian Radio-television and Telecommunications Commission in Canada, the Kapisanan ng mga Brodkaster ng Pilipinas in the Philippines, the Korea Communications Commission in South Korea, the Australian Communications and Media Authority in Australia, and Ofcom in the United Kingdom. The offending words may be silenced, reversed, distorted, or replaced by a tone or sound effect. The edits may come from the record label itself, broadcasters at the corporate level before the song is sent for airplay to their stations, or in rarer cases, at a radio station itself depending on local standards.

One example of censoring profanity is "Talk Dirty" (2014) by Jason Derulo featuring 2 Chainz, in which the radio edit omits three of the words present in the song: "penis", "sex" and "pussy". "Penis" is replaced with an elephant sound effect, "sex" is replaced by an echo of the word "oral" which precedes it in the standard album version from Tattoos (2013) and Talk Dirty (2014), and "pussy" is replaced with a sound effect of a cat meowing. Occasionally, the song may be re-recorded with different lyrics, ranging from just the replacement of one line being re-recorded, like James Blunt's "You're Beautiful" (2005), which replaces "fucking high" from the original version on his album Back to Bedlam (2004) with "flying high" in the second verse, to the entire song be completely changed, such as D12's "Purple Hills" (2001), which replaces profanity, drug references, and other inappropriate lyrics from the original "Purple Pills". Another example of the first type (one-line replacement) is the Black Eyed Peas song "Let's Get It Started" (2004), whose original title was "Let's Get Retarded" but was changed to make it suitable for radio play. Sean Kingston's "Beautiful Girls" (2007), in some radio edits, changed "You got me suicidal" to "in denial". The whole chorus of CeeLo Green's "Fuck You" (2010) substituted the word "Fuck" with "Forget", thus changing the title to "Forget You" on the radio edit. In Bruno Mars' song "That's What I Like" (2017), as played on The Steve Harvey Morning Show, "You and your ass invited" is replaced by an instrumental version; the same occurs in the line, "Sex by the fire at night". Taylor Swift's song "Betty" (2020) from her album Folklore, substitutes the line "Would you tell me to go , or take me to the garden?" to "Would you tell me to go , or take me to the garden?".

Radio edits may have more or fewer words edited than the "clean version", because of the stations' or agencies' standards.  A "dirty" radio edit preserving the sound of the offensive word or words but maintaining the shorter play time may be produced, which may be aimed at club play, nighttime radio, and non-terrestrial radio stations. After two million copies of Michael Jackson's "They Don't Care About Us" (1996) had already been shipped, the lyrics of the original track with the words "Jew me" and "Kike me" were replaced with "do me" and "strike me" due to its controversial anti-Semitic references. Radio edit versions of the track remained with the original version until the edited version was pressed and released. An example occurs in Lady Gaga's song "Poker Face" (2008), where the line "P-p-p-poker face, p-p-fuck her face" has barely noticeable profanities. Some radio stations repeated the word "poker" from the first part of the line, while others played the original version. A promotional CD single is available containing both of these versions. The edited version is also available on the compilation Now 31 in the US.

In an unusual case, Lizzo's "Truth Hurts" (2017) was edited locally in June 2019 by the market-leading Top 40 station WIXX in Green Bay, Wisconsin, not because of inappropriate content, but due to Lizzo's reference in a lyric to an unnamed new player on the Minnesota Vikings. As WIXX is one of three flagship stations for the Green Bay Packers' radio network and features wraparound content involving the Packers, the station determined that referencing their hometown football team's closest rival in a positive manner would be jarring to local listeners.

Some individual stations may be more lenient with words that tread the broadcast-appropriate line, depending on their management and programming format; for instance a rhythmic AC, classic hits, adult contemporary or urban contemporary station may indeed make several radio edits to a song to appeal to a broad base of listeners, while a rhythmic contemporary, modern rock or hip hop-focused station might be more apt to have a light hand in their radio edits to appeal both to listeners and artists who would be favorable to the station's reputation. Some edits might even be done for promotional reasons; for instance a song that mentions a city's name or a certain radio station might see a special 'station cut' where the station and its community are mentioned in the song (as heard in Lady Gaga's "You and I" (2011), which has a reference to Nebraska that is easily substituted with another region, state or city; similarly, Sia's "Cheap Thrills" (2015) is sometimes edited to replace the line "turn the radio on" with "...turn [station name] on" to promote the radio station on which the song is playing).

Other terms

Other terms for a "radio edit"

 "UK radio edit" (for radio edits made for the British market). 
 "Album edit" (Sometimes a different version from the 'radio edit')
 "F.M. Version"
 "Station edit/ID"(when a radio station replaces a part of a song with its name to promote it)
 "LP edit" (Also sometimes a different version from the 'radio edit')
 "Airplay edit"
 "7" edit"
 "7" mix"
 "7" remix"
 "7" version"
 "Radio mix"
 "Radio cut"
 "Radio remix"
 "Edit"
 "Edited mix"
 "Edited remix"
 "Edited version"
 "Short edit"
 "Short mix"
 "Short radio edit"
 "Short radio mix"
 "Short radio remix"
 "Short version"
 "Short radio version"
 "Radio version"
 "Clean edit"
 "Clean radio edit"
 "Clean radio version"
 "Clean version"
 "Child-friendly version"
 "Children's version"
 "Family-friendly version"
 "Single version" (Typically used to reference a stand-alone single that isn't issued to an album, singles taken from soundtracks, or lead singles from an album)
 "Soundtrack version" (Typically used like the previous term above, but not to reference a studio album's lead single)
 "Single edit" (Shortened version of a single version typically)
 "Short single edit"
 "Single edit"
 "Single mix"
 "Single remix"
 "Main version" (Can also be the album version but typical is the radio formatted version)
 "Main edit" (If the "main version" is the album version, then the "main edit" is typically the radio edit)
 "New edit"
 "Amended"
 "Amended version"
 "Original edit"
 "A/C Mix" (Is an alternative edit of the mainstream version formatted for Adult Contemporary radio)
 "Alternative remix"
 "Alternative Mix"
 "RD version" (For songs edited to play on Radio Disney)
 "Video version"
 "Video edit"

See also
Censorship on MTV
List of "songs with questionable lyrics" following the September 11, 2001 attacks
Loudness war
Parental Advisory: Explicit Content

References

Censorship of music
Censorship of broadcasting
Radio broadcasting
Self-censorship